Guduru is a village in Guduru Mandal in Krishna district of the Indian state of Andhra Pradesh. It is a Guduru Mandal head quarter, located 7 KM towards west from District head quarters Machilipatnam.
Guduru Pin code is 521149 and postal head office is Guduru S.O

Machilipatnam , Pedana , Gudivada , Repalle are the nearby Cities to Guduru.

  ].

See also 
Villages in Guduru mandal

References 

Villages in Krishna district
Mandal headquarters in Krishna district